Antigenidas of Thebes (fl. 4th century BC), the musician,  son of Satyrus or Dionysius, was a celebrated Greek aulos-player, and also a poet. He lived in the time of Alexander the Great. His two daughters, Melo and Satyra, who followed the profession of their father, are mentioned in an epigram of the Greek Anthology. Gian Francesco Malipiero,  Italian musician of the 20th century, composed an honorary  in 1962.

References

Suidas and Harpocrat. s. v.; Plut. de Alex. fort. p. 355, a., de Music, p. 1138, a.; Cic. Brut. 50 ; Bode, Gescli. d. lyrisch. Diclitkunst d. Hellenen^ ii. p. 3*21, &c.
Who's Who in the Age of Alexander the Great by Waldemar Heckel 

Ancient Greek flautists
Ancient Greek poets
4th-century BC Greek people
Ancient Thebans
4th-century BC poets